Claude Milton "Mick" Kicklighter Sr. (born August 22, 1933) is a retired United States Army officer. He is a former commander of the United States Army Western Command (later United States Army Pacific), which he held from 1989 to 1991. He was also Director for Security Assistance for the US Army Security Assistance Center and Chief of Staff for the US Army Material Development and Readiness Command in Alexandria, Virginia, from 1981–1984 and Assistant Deputy Chief of Staff for Logistics and Director of the Army Staff for the Office of Chief of Staff in Washington, D.C.  Kicklighter was commander of the 25th Infantry Division from 1984 until being succeeded by James W. Crysel in 1986.

He is an alumnus of Glennville High School, the Georgia Military College, the University of Georgia, Mercer University (B.A. in Biology, June 1955), George Washington University (M.A. in Management of National Resources, August 1974), and the Industrial College of the Armed Forces. In 2007, he was named Inspector General of the Department of Defense, having previously served as Chief of Staff, Department of Veterans Affairs, Special Advisor to the Deputy Secretary of State for Stabilization and Security Operations in Iraq and Afghanistan,  Director of the Department of Defense's Iraq Transition Team, Assistant Secretary for Policy and Planning, Department of Veterans Affairs and Deputy Under Secretary of the Army for International Affairs.

His awards include the Distinguished Service Medal, the Defense Superior Service Medal, the Legion of Merit, and the Bronze Star Medal. He retired from the Army in 1991.

References

External links

1933 births
Living people
People from Glennville, Georgia
Mercer University alumni
United States Army personnel of the Vietnam War
George Washington University School of Business alumni
Recipients of the Legion of Merit
United States Army generals
Recipients of the Defense Superior Service Medal
Recipients of the Distinguished Service Medal (US Army)